The Wardal were an Aboriginal Australian people of the Mid West and Goldfields-Esperance regions of Western Australia.

Country
Their southern boundaries lay round Lake Nabberu while their westernmost extension appears to have gone as far as the Old Bald Hill Station near Beyond Bluff.

Name
Wardal appears to mean 'west' and by extension, 'westerners'.

Alternative names
 Tjitijamba.
 Tjitjijamba.
 Waula. (Pini exonym bearing the sense of "northerners").

Notes

Citations

Sources

Aboriginal peoples of Western Australia